XHKC-FM 100.9/XEKC-AM 1460 is a combo radio station in Oaxaca City, Oaxaca, Mexico. It is owned by Grupo Radio Centro and carries its La Z regional Mexican format.

History

XEKC received its first concession on April 8, 1981. It was owned by La Voz de Oaxaca, S.A. and expanded to FM in 1994.

On May 21, 2021, the station changes its brand, from "Planeta" pop format to "La Z" regional Mexican format.

References

1981 establishments in Mexico
Mass media in Oaxaca City
Grupo Radio Centro
Radio stations established in 1981
Radio stations in Oaxaca City
Regional Mexican radio stations
Spanish-language radio stations